Nader Ghazipour (born 1958 in Urmia) is an Iranian conservative politician who represents Urmia electoral district in the Islamic Consultative Assembly since 2008.

Views
Ghazipour supports teaching Azeri in schools and Turkic-speaking factions in Iran's parliament.

References

External links
 gazipoor Website

People from Urmia
Deputies of Urmia
Living people
1958 births
Members of the 9th Islamic Consultative Assembly
Members of the 8th Islamic Consultative Assembly
Members of the 10th Islamic Consultative Assembly
Followers of Wilayat fraction members
Urmia University alumni
Islamic Revolutionary Guard Corps personnel of the Iran–Iraq War